The Walker Mohawk First Nation is a Mohawk First Nation in southern Ontario, and is a member nation of the Six Nations of the Grand River. Its reserves include the shared reserves of Glebe Farm 40B and the Six Nations of the Grand River First Nation.

References

Mohawk tribe
First Nations governments in Ontario